The Anglican Church of St Michael in Wayford, Somerset, England was built in the 13th century. It is a Grade II* listed building.

History

The church was built in the 13th century and was remodelled in the 18th, 19th and early 20th centuries. Work in 1800 involved rebuilding the front wall and that of 1846 was required after part of the chancel collapsed. The porch was added in 1602. There was a gallery at the west end of the church but this has been removed.

The parish is part of the Wulfic benefice within the Diocese of Bath and Wells.

Architecture

The stone building has hamstone dressings and slate roofs with a small wooden bell turret at the western end. with two bells. It has a three-bay nave, single-bay chancel and north aisle.

Inside the church is a 14th-century double piscina. The font may also date from the 14th century.

See also
 List of ecclesiastical parishes in the Diocese of Bath and Wells

References

Grade II* listed buildings in South Somerset
Grade II* listed churches in Somerset
Church of England church buildings in South Somerset